Daring Danger may refer to:

 Daring Danger (1922 film)
 Daring Danger (1932 film)